In mathematics, a Lie-* algebra is a D-module with a Lie* bracket.

References

Lie algebras